Cantharis figurata is a species of soldier beetles native to Europe.

References

Cantharidae
Beetles described in 1843
Beetles of Europe
Taxa named by Carl Gustaf Mannerheim (naturalist)